Ode to Duty (written in 1805; published in 1807) is a poem (an ode) written by William Wordsworth.

Description
“Ode to Duty” is an appeal to the principle of morality for guidance and support. It represents in a measure a recantation of Wordsworth's earlier faith in the spontaneous and unguided impulses of the heart, written at a time when he was coming to feel more and more the need of an invariable standard. While continuing to recognize the worth and beauty of the creed of joy and love, he feels that there must be also the mandate of the stern power which preserves the stars in their courses and lays the law of sacrifice and self-restraint upon the soul of the individual. Stern as is the voice of duty, it is yet also divinely beautiful,

The mood and temper of the “Ode to Duty” is characteristic of much of Wordsworth's later work. According to Wordsworth's own statement, the “Ode to Duty” was modeled on Thomas Gray's “Hymn to Adversity,” which in turn was imitated from Horace's “Ode to Fortune.” The stanza is identical with that used by Gray, and there are resemblances in ideas and phraseology.

The ode consists of 56 lines. There are 7 stanzas of 8 lines each. It follows the rhyming scheme of ABABCCDD.

References

External links
  (multiple versions)

Poetry by William Wordsworth
1807 poems